DanceAfrica is a heritage and community celebration equable on the manifold dance forms of the African Diaspora held annually in New York City, Washington, DC, and Chicago. Included are indoor and outdoor performance including live music, a film series, master classes, education programs, and an outdoor bazaar. Its current artistic director is Abdel R. Salaam.

DanceAfrica NYC

History
The political movements in the 1960s and the growth of dance in the 1970s led to the development of a number of African American dance companies. The celebration DanceAfrica, created by Chuck Davis, built on the momentum of those 1960s and 70s movements through its showcase of African and African-American traditions and art forms. In the 1940s and 1950s, an African American cultural awareness emerged, seen in performances by Pearl Primus and Katherine Dunham at BAM, the dance focus was shifted from entertainment toward modern dance while integrating African elements. In the 1960s, Alvin Ailey, Talley Beatty, and Donald McKayle appeared at BAM. These artists were based at the Harlem Cultural Center with the New Dance Group when Chuck Davis arrived in the early 1960s. Davis moved to New York City to perform with musician Babatunde Olatunji; he also studied Dunham technique and jazz with Syvilla Fort. In 1967 Davis formed the Chuck Davis Dance Company at the South Bronx Community Action Theatre, later moved to Bronx Community College.
 
In February 1977, the Chuck Davis Dance Company performed in a constructed African village in the BAM Lepercq Space. Based on the success of the engagement, DanceAfrica debuted the following spring beginning with a day-long African bazaar. Arthur Hall, Charles Moore, Chuck Davis, Dinizulu, and the International Afrikan American Ballet participated in the festival, which offered five performances in the BAM Playhouse and culminated with all five companies—approximately 70 performers—on the Opera House stage. A festival was born, growing into the country's largest annual celebration of African and African American dance and, adding dates in other cities such as Chicago; Washington, DC; Los Angeles; Miami; Minneapolis; Philadelphia; Pittsburgh; and many others. Dallas recently made the festival an annual event. DanceAfrica is BAM’s longest running performance series—and has become a Memorial Day weekend tradition in Brooklyn. Weddings, christenings, and other ceremonies have taken place during DanceAfrica—transcending performance and becoming ritual—a community’s celebration of African identity. Rennie Harris is also one choreographer.

In the 1980s Chuck Davis added master classes in African movement and music. DanceAfrica 1993 opened with a motorcade procession from Harlem to the steps of BAM. Fifty-two members of the Imperial Bikers Motorcycle Club, each carrying the flag of an African country, were joined by the Council of Elders, artists, and dignitaries for a libation pouring ceremony that included a gigantic carrot cake baked in the shape of Africa. The 20th Anniversary Celebration in 1997 debuted the BAM/Restoration DanceAfrica Ensemble, a collaboration between BAM and the Bedford Stuyvesant Restoration Corporation’s Youth Arts Academy that has become an annual crowd favorite.

DanceAfrica has showcased troupes based both in Africa and the African Diaspora including many from New York. Companies have ranged in style from indigenous African to urban American hip-hop. DanceAfrica has shown that “traditional” African dance is not fixed in time and remains tremendously inclusive and diverse, and that even the most cutting-edge choreography can contain African influences. DanceAfrica embodies tradition, but also a spirit of change and growth reaching back into the past and forward into the future, embracing the links between cultures across the African Diaspora, always bearing the message, “Peace, love, and respect for everybody!”
 
In 2007, DanceAfrica celebrates its 30th festival with 30 Years of DanceAfrica: Remember! Honor! Respect! An African Dance Odyssey, and marks another milestone—its founder Baba Chuck Davis’ 70th birthday.

Performance history

DanceAfrica DC

Since 1987, annually in June, Chuck Davis serves as the master of ceremonies of the Festival in Washington, DC, hosted by Dance Place.

DanceAfrica, DC is a jubilant annual celebration of the cultural vitality of Africa and its diaspora in the nation's capital. Inspired by the Brooklyn Academy of Music's festival and under the guidance of Dr. Baba Chuck Davis, Dance Place spearheaded its own unique format and traditions for this vital and vibrant celebration in 1987. Today, Director of Dance Place's African Dance Program Sylvia Soumah serves as Artistic Director and Griot since the passing of our much beloved Baba Chuck Davis in 2017. DanceAfrica, DC is one of the longest running arms of this nationwide phenomena, celebrating over 30 years of education, artistry and advocacy for African culture in our nation's capital.

DanceAfrica Chicago

DanceAfrica Chicago began in 1990 and is presented by Columbia College Chicago.  The Festival did not occur between the years of 2006-2007.

References

External links
 Brooklyn Academy of Music
 The Chuck Davis Dance Company 
 Museum of Contemporary African Diasporan Arts MoCADA
 New Dance Group
 Bedford Stuyvesant Restoration Corporation
 Dance Place
 DanceAfrica Interview with Abdel Salaam

Music festivals in New York City
Dance festivals in the United States
Festivals in New York City
African-American dance
African-American theatre
Dance in New York City
Dance in Washington, D.C.
Dance in Illinois